Mid-July Days 2 is a 2016 Chinese horror thriller film directed by Li Hong Jian and the second film in the Mid-July Days film series, following 2015's Mid-July Days. It was released in China on August 19, 2016.

Plot

Cast
Chen Meixing 
Zhai Zimo
Luo Xiang
Wang Liang
Zhao Ji
Miao Qing
Xia Xingling
Chang Yiran
Fu Man
Zhang Lifei
Zeng Yilian

Reception
The film has grossed  at the Chinese box office.

References

2016 horror films
2016 horror thriller films
Chinese supernatural horror films
Chinese horror thriller films